Danny Verpaele (born October 5, 1985) is an American football player and coach. He played as the free safety for the University of South Florida (USF) Bulls  NCAA Division I college football team. Verpaele is a 2004 graduate of Merritt Island High School. Verpaele coached linebackers as a graduate assistant at Mississippi State, and is currently the defensive backs coach for the Kennesaw State Owls. Verpaele previously served as the defensive coordinator and linebackers coach at Valdosta State, where he won a Division II National Championship in 2018. Prior to VSU, Verpaele served as offensive quality control and tight ends coach at Army, defensive backs coach at Jacksonville University, and he began his coaching career as a graduate assistant at VMI.

High school
Verpaele was a four-year lettermen for the Merritt Island Mustangs. In his junior year (2002–2003), Verpaele led the Mustangs to the regional semifinals, losing to Drew Weatherford-led Land O' Lakes High School 20-14 on November 29, 2002. Verpaele was a Class 4A Second-Team All-State selectee in 2002. 
In 2003, his senior year, Verpaele erupted, passing for 1,531 yards and rushing for 1,015. Verpaele led the Mustangs to the regional final championship but they fell short, losing 27-0 to Washington High School on December 5, 2003. Verpaele also played defensive back and was voted Brevard County All-Space Coast Defensive Player of the Year by the Florida Today. the Orlando Sentinel voted Verpaele to its All-Central Florida team and he was ranked as the 68th Best Prospect in the state of Florida. In 2003, Verpaele was again voted to the Class 4A All-State Second Team. Verpaele holds the distinction as being the first player in school history to start all four years.

College
 2004 - Verpaele played in 11 games his freshman year, making 25 solo tackles, 32 assisted for 57 total tackles. Verpaele also had two sacks, six tackles for a loss of 13 yards, one pass break up and one fumble recovered. For his standout frosh season, Verpaele earned Sporting News Third-Team Freshman All-American honors.
 2005 - Medical Redshirt (broken ankle)
 2006 - Verpaele played in 13 games, making 26 solo tackles, 13 assisted for 39 total tackles. Verpaele recorded one tackle for a loss and recorded an interception versus North Carolina, returning it 26 yards. On November 25, 2006, versus No. 7 West Virginia, Verpaele made one of the biggest plays of the season, as he hit running back Steve Slaton on the goal line, forcing a fumble which USF recovered. The Bulls would go on to beat its then-highest ranked opponent in school history 24–19. Verpaele also recorded five tackles and broke up three passes in the Bulls bowl victory over East Carolina in the PapaJohns.com Bowl on December 23, 2006.
 2007 Did not play
 2008 Senior safety for the Bulls.

Trivia
 Was first player in Merritt Island High School football history to start all four seasons.
 Danny's older brother Kevin Verpaele (1999–2003) was a 4-year standout for USF. Danny also wears the same jersey number (#17) Kevin wore. Kevin and Danny make just the second set of brothers to play for Head Coach Jim Leavitt (the others being Bill and Santiago Gramática).

References

1985 births
Living people
People from Cocoa Beach, Florida
Players of American football from Florida
American football safeties
South Florida Bulls football players
Coaches of American football from Florida
VMI Keydets football coaches
Jacksonville Dolphins football coaches
Mississippi State Bulldogs football coaches
Army Black Knights football coaches
Kennesaw State Owls football coaches
Valdosta State Blazers football coaches